Malhi may refer to:

People

 Ali Asjad Malhi, Pakistani politician of Punjabi ancestry 
 Naseer Ahmad Malhi, Pakistani politician of Punjabi ancestry 
 Harinder Malhi, Canadian politician of Punjabi ancestry
 Gobind Malhi, Indian writer of Sindhi literature
 Gurbax Singh Malhi, Canadian politician of Punjabi ancestry
 Manju Malhi, British chef of Punjabi ancestry

Other

 Malhi (Jat clan)